Hui Chiu-yin BBS (Chinese: 許招賢), also known as John Hui, is the director and general manager of New World First Ferry in Hong Kong after his retirement from the post of Chief Superintendent  of Marine Regional in Hong Kong Police Force in 1996. He had been the Chief Commission of The Scout Association of Hong Kong from 1997 to 2003.

Scout
Hui was awarded the Queen's Scout in 1960 when he was in the 7th Hong Kong Group of Hong Kong Scout Association and became a scout leader later. He severed in the Island North District, Island Region, the Headquarters and Asia-Pacific Region of the World Organization of the Scout Movement.

He succeeded Chau Cham-son to be the Chief Commission from January 1, 1997. He successfully met the target to increase the number of Scouts to 83,000 in 2002. There are several major events during his commissionership, namely 19th Asia-Pacific Regional Scout Conference in 1998, The Scout Association of Hong Kong Millennium Jamboree from 1999 to 2000, 45th Baden-Powell World Fellowship Event in 2002 and The Scout Association of Hong Kong 90th Anniversary Jamboree in 2003. A new region, New Territories East Region is spin off from New Territories Region in 2000.
His appointment ended on December 31, 2003 and was succeeded by Pau Shiu-hung.

He was a member of the Regional Scout Committee of Asia Pacific Region from 2001 to 2007.

He is now the Vice chairperson of the APR Scout Financial Resource Sub-committee.

New World First Ferry
After his retirement from Hong Kong Police Force, he was invited to join New World First Ferry in 1996 as he is familiar with the matters of Outlying Island. He instituted a multi-million (Hong Kong) dollar reform of the ferry, including the replacement of twelve hovercraft to increase the navigation stability.

He had increased media exposure following the widely reported ferry accident which occurred on May 12, 2006.

Award
He received a Bronze Bauhinia Star from the Hong Kong Government in 2003.

Footnotes

Hong Kong Police Force
Alumni of King's College, Hong Kong
New World Development people
Living people
Hong Kong businesspeople
Hong Kong civil servants
Recipients of the Bronze Bauhinia Star
People associated with Scouting
Scouting and Guiding in Hong Kong
Year of birth missing (living people)